Geghamavan is a village in the Sevan Municipality of the Gegharkunik Province of Armenia.

History 
The village was founded in the 1830s by migrants from the Maku region of Persia. There are church/shrine ruins in the eastern part of the village.

Gallery

References

External links 

 
 

Populated places in Gegharkunik Province
Populated places established in the 1830s